Khaled Al Shaer (born December 20, 1987) is a Bahraini journalist.

Biography
Al Shaer studied at the Department of Communication and Multimedia of the University of Bahrain, hosted نجوم الظهاري (“Stars of Al-Dhahari”) and هوى الديرة (“Hawi Al-Deera”) on Bahrain Radio, and hosted some episodes of Sawalif on the satellite channel Wanasah, a sister network of MBC. He also appeared on the reality show Hiya Wa Huwa with his then-wife, Saudi pop singer Aseel Omran. Al Shaer also participated in government ceremonies and acted in several works. In 2014, he appeared on the Saudi version of the impression show Your Face Sounds Familiar, competing for charity on behalf of the Sanad Children's Cancer Support Society.

Personal life
Al Shaer married Omran on August 8, 2008, but separated in 2012, reconciled in 2015, but finally divorced in 2016. Their son Walid died at an early age. On July 18, 2018, he married journalist Noor el-Sheikh, daughter of Bahraini singer Khaled El Sheikh.

Acting career

External links
 El Cinema page

References

1987 births
Living people
Bahraini television personalities
University of Bahrain alumni